Coiffy-le-Haut is a commune in the Haute-Marne department in north-eastern France. The current mayor of Coiffy-le-Haut is Aurore Vincent who will be in office until 2026.

See also
Communes of the Haute-Marne department

References

Coiffylehaut